Anthony Fournier (born 30 April 1989 in France) is a French footballer.

References

French footballers
Association football midfielders
Living people
1989 births
ASA Issy players
US Roye-Noyon players
R.F.C. Seraing (1922) players
K.V. Woluwe-Zaventem players
Royale Union Saint-Gilloise players
US Granville players
AS Beauvais Oise players
US Lusitanos Saint-Maur players